Supercarrier is an American military drama television series that aired on ABC from March 6 until May 14, 1988. It features US Navy Pilots aboard the fictional aircraft carrier USS Georgetown. It suffered from low ratings against CBS's Murder, She Wrote and NBC's Family Ties, and only lasted eight episodes before being cancelled.

Cast
 Robert Hooks as Capt. Jim Coleman
 Ken Olandt as Lt Jack "Sierra" DePalma
 Paul Gleason (pilot episode)
 Cec Verrell as Lt Ruth "Bee-Bee" Ruthkowski
 John David Bland as Lt Doyle "ANZAC" Sampson
 Gerardo Mejía as Master-at-Arms 3rd Class Luis Cruz
 Michael Sharrett (pilot episode)
 Matthew Walker as Seaman Raymond Lafitte
 Tasia Valenza  (pilot episode)
 Wendie Malick  (pilot episode)
 Denise Nicholas  (pilot episode)
 Scott Kraft  (pilot episode)
 Craig Stevens  (pilot episode)
 Thomas Beck  (pilot episode)
 Alex Hyde-White as Lt Dave "Hat Trick" Rawley
 Dale Dye as Capt Henry K. 'Hank' Madigan
 Richard Jaeckel as Master Chief Sam Rivers
 Dennis R. "Beau" Sumner, Jr.
 Matthew Williams
 Peter Mark Richman  (2nd episode)
 William Smith  (3rd episode)
 Ismael 'East' Carlo  (5th episode)
 Gina Gallego  (5th episode)
 Harley Jane Kozak  (5th episode)
 Jennifer Darling  (6th episode)
 Lyman Ward  (7th episode)
 Lawrence Kopp as Deadly Enemies (Pilot)

Production

The Department of the Navy pulled its support for the show in March 1988, with a spokesperson citing dissatisfaction with the plots of upcoming episodes in which the carrier "just becomes a backdrop" for stories unrelated to the U.S. Navy. The producer, Charles Fries, said in response that the Navy "wanted a sleepy show about life on a Supercarrier" and that he was "happy to be relieved of the cooperation because naval personnel were stifling our writers relationships and dialogue".

Episodes

References

External links
 

1988 American television series debuts
1988 American television series endings
American Broadcasting Company original programming
1980s American drama television series
English-language television shows
American military television series
Aviation television series
Television series by MGM Television
Television shows set in New York City
Television series created by Steven E. de Souza
United States Naval Aviators